Fudge is a type of confection that is made by mixing sugar, butter and milk. It has its origins in 19th century USA and was popular in the women's colleges of the time. Fudge can come in a variety of flavorings depending on the region or country it was made; popular flavors include fruit, nut, chocolate and caramel. Fudge is often bought as a gift from a gift shop in tourist areas and attractions.

History 

The term fudge is said to have originated in the 17th century from the verb fadge and means "to fit together in a clumsy manner". During this period, fudge was used as an interjection by sailors to respond to nonsense or untruths. 

Fudge as a confection gained traction in the United States during the late 19th century; recipes for fudge were printed in many periodicals and advertisements during the 1880s. Its inexpensive, unrefined qualities made it popular among people looking for an alternative that fell between expensive candies and the cheapest sweets. Specialized fudge shops began opening in tourist places such as Mackinac Island, Michigan, in 1887.  The increase in fudge's popularity was partly due to the accessibility of its production process: ordinary people were able to make it in their homes without any specialized equipment. In addition, the cost of refined white sugar had been decreasing at the time, cutting production costs.

Fudge at women's colleges 
Making fudge was a popular activity at women's colleges, especially Vassar College in Poughkeepsie, New York. In a letter written by Emelyn Battersby Hartridge, a student at Vassar, she recounts purchasing of a box of fudge for 40 cents a pound in 1886 in Baltimore, Maryland. Another student at Vassar College claimed to have introduced it there in 1888 by selling her own  batch. The diary of student Elma Martin mentions making "fudges" in 1892. A 1893 letter from a Vassar College student Adelaide Mansfield describes "fudges" as containing sugar, fruit, chocolate, milk, and butter. 

A recipe for "Fudges at Vassar" was printed in The Sun in 1895. Despite describing the confections as "Vassar chocolates", the recipe given comprises sugar, milk, butter, and vanilla extract. Wellesley College and Smith College have their own versions of a fudge recipe dating from the late 19th or early 20th century.

Production

Texture 
In texture, fudge falls between fondant icing and hard caramels. In forming a fondant, it is not easy to keep all vibrations and seed crystals from causing rapid crystallization into large crystals. Consequently, milkfat and corn syrup are often added to prevent premature crystallization. Corn syrup contains glucose, fructose (monosaccharides), and maltose (disaccharide). These sugars interact with sucrose molecules, inhibiting crystal contact to prevent premature crystallization. The added milkfat also helps to prevent rapid crystallization.

Controlling the crystallization of the supersaturated sugar solution is the key to making smooth fudge. Initiating crystals before the desired time will result in fudge with fewer, larger sugar grains. The final texture would then be grainy, a quality that is normally indicative of lower quality fudge.

Cooling and later stages 
It is the endpoint temperature separates hard caramel from fudge. The higher the peak temperature, the more sugar is dissolved and the more water evaporates, resulting in a higher ratio of sugar to water. Before the availability of cheap and accurate thermometers, cooks would use the ice-water (or cold water) test to determine the saturation of the confection. Butter is then added to the mixture and the fudge is cooled and beaten until it is thick and small sugar crystals have formed. The warm fudge is sometimes poured onto a marble slab to be cooled and shaped.

Varieties
Fudge-making has evolved a variety of flavors and additives. The favored flavors vary by location: in the United States, chocolate is a default flavor, with peanut butter and maple as alternatives. When it is made from brown sugar, it is called penuche and is typically found in New England and the Southern States. 

In the UK, rum-and-raisin, clotted cream and salted-caramel are popular flavors. Fudge shares similarities with tablet, a confection with similar ingredients but a grainy, brittle texture.Tablet is sometimes labelled as butter fudge—or simply fudge—outside of Scotland.

Hot fudge 
Hot fudge sauce is a chocolate product often used in the United States and Canada as a topping for ice cream in a heated form, particularly sundaes, parfaits and occasionally s'mores. The butter in typical fudge is replaced with heavy cream, resulting in a thick chocolate sauce that is pourable while hot and becomes denser as the sauce cools. Commercial hot fudge sauce syrups (flavored with either natural or artificial flavorings) are generally thinner and formulated to be usable at room temperature.

See also 

 Barfi – an Indian mithai made by cooking milk and sugar into the consistency of fudge
 
 
 Knäck – a Swedish toffee confection
 Krówki – Polish confection similar to fudge

References

External links 
 Science of candy: Fudge, Exploratorium

American desserts
Chocolate desserts
Chocolate
Christmas food
Confectionery
Dessert sauces